Tomorrow We Live is a 1936 British drama film directed by H. Manning Haynes and starring Godfrey Tearle, Haidee Wright and Renee Gadd. Its plot concerns a financier on the brink of ruin.

It was made at Elstree Studios.

Premise
A financier on the brink of ruin reflects over his failings, and gives £50 to various down-and-outs in the hope that they can make something better of their lives.

Cast
 Godfrey Tearle as Sir Charles Hendra
 Haidee Wright as Mrs. Gill
 Renee Gadd as Patricia Gordon
 Sebastian Shaw as Eric Morton
 Eliot Makeham as Henry Blossom
 Thea Holme as Mary Leighton
 George Carney as Mr. Taylor
 Rosalind Atkinson as Mrs. Taylor
 Jessica Black as Mrs. Carter
 Fred Withers as Mr. Carter
 Cyril Raymond as George Warner

References

External links

1936 films
1936 drama films
Films directed by H. Manning Haynes
British drama films
Films set in London
Films shot at British International Pictures Studios
British black-and-white films
1930s English-language films
1930s British films